{{DISPLAYTITLE:C8H17NO3S}}
The molecular formula C8H17NO3S (molar mass: 207.28 g/mol) may refer to:

 CHES (buffer), a buffering agent
 Felinine, a chemical compound and amino acid found in cat urine

Molecular formulas